Dahana i Ghuri district (pop: 86,400) is located in the most southwestern part of Baghlan province, Afghanistan. The capital is Dahana i Ghuri (also:Dahaneh-ye Ġawri, Dahana Gori, Dahana Ghori, Dahaneh-ye Ghowri). Its population is about 3,400 people. It is connected with Baghlan and Puli Khumri with an all-weather primary road.

District profile:
 Villages: 105
 Schools: 18 primary, 7 secondary, 11 high schools
 Health centers: 2 basic, 1 comprehensive

Economy
The majority of residents are engaged in farming and animal breeding.  Main agricultural products include: wheat, barley, sesame, Zaghar, melon and water melon.  Animals include: cow, sheep, donkey, horse and birds.

History
The district was captured by the Taliban on 15 August 2016 after days of fighting with Afghan forces.

External links
Map of Settlements United Nations, AIMS, May 2002

References

Districts of Baghlan Province